Petinomys is a genus of flying squirrels. They are known commonly as the dwarf flying squirrels.

There are approximately 8 species. They are native to Asia.

Species include:
 Basilan flying squirrel (Petinomys crinitus)
 Travancore flying squirrel (Petinomys fuscocapillus)
 Whiskered flying squirrel (Petinomys genibarbis)
 Hagen's flying squirrel (Petinomys hageni)
 Siberut flying squirrel (Petinomys lugens)
 Mindanao flying squirrel (Petinomys mindanensis)
 Arrow flying squirrel (Petinomys sagitta)
 Temminck's flying squirrel (Petinomys setosus)
 Vordermann's flying squirrel (Petinomys vordermanni)

Notes

References
 Thorington, R. W. Jr. and R. S. Hoffman. 2005. Family Sciuridae. pp. 754–818 in Mammal Species of the World a Taxonomic and Geographic Reference. D. E. Wilson and D. M. Reeder eds. Johns Hopkins University Press, Baltimore.

 
Rodent genera
Taxa named by Oldfield Thomas
Taxonomy articles created by Polbot